First Date is a 2021 American mystery comedy-drama film directed and written by Manuel Crosby and Darren Knapp. The film stars Tyson Brown, Shelby Duclos, Jesse Janzen, Nicole Berry and Samuel Ademola.

The film had its world premiere at the Sundance Film Festival on January 31, 2021, and was released in theaters and on Apple TV on July 2, 2021, in the United States by Magnet Releasing.

Plot

Cast
The cast include:
 Tyson Brown as Mike
 Shelby Duclos as Kelsey
 Jesse Janzen as The Captain
 Nicole Berry as Sergeant Davis
 Samuel Ademola as Deputy Duchovny
 Ryan Quinn Adams as Vince
 Angela Barber as Ricky
 Josh Fesler as Brett
 Dave Reimer as Shannon
 Leah Finity as Darla
 Jake Howard as Donnie
 Scott E. Noble as Dennis
 Brittany Rietz as Confused Car Woman
 Nicholas Macias as Bystander
 Keldamuzik as Mike's Mom

Release
The film had its premiere in the "Next" section of the Sundance Film Festival on January 31, 2021. A month later, the film's US distribution rights were acquired by Magnet Releasing, the genre film label of Magnolia Pictures, with plans to release it in theaters and on Apple TV in the United States on July 2, 2021.

Reception
The film received mixed reviews from critics. The review aggregator website Rotten Tomatoes surveyed  and, categorizing the reviews as positive or negative, assessed 18 as positive and 14 as negative for a 56% rating. Among the reviews, it determined an average rating of 6.0 out of 10. The website's critics consensus reads, "Although this First Date might have gone more smoothly, it remains an (occasionally very) funny crime caper – and an intriguing calling card for debuting co-directors Manuel Crosby and Darren Knapp."

Kristy Puchko of RogerEbert.com wrote, "Overall, this wild-ass comedy is a jolting thrill ride, packed with barbed jokes, hilarious characters, and threaded with a sweet and simple romance that pulls us through the wonkier bits. Simply put, First Date is a diamond in the rough, but a diamond nonetheless."

Danielle Solzman of Solzy at the Movies praised Crosby and Knapp's direction and positively compared the film to the work of Robert Rodriguez, Quentin Tarantino and the Coen Brothers, while further adding, "I've seen some beautiful films in the NEXT program and First Date could very well be the next hit to come from it. When we look back on this unique Sundance in a few years from now, we'll be able to say that's where Manuel Crosby and Darren Knapp were discovered."

John DeFore of The Hollywood Reporter was critical of the film, but praised the performances of Brown and Duclos, writing "The film gets a bit more enjoyable as soon as the two share the screen together. But they have precious little time for flirty banter before Knapp and Crosby throw them back into action copped from other genre movies. This time it's a True Romance-like standoff between teams of heavily armed people arguing over drugs and money. It's amazing how much of this mayhem Mike survives before the script decides it's time for him to do something."

References

External links
 
 
 

2021 crime drama films
2021 comedy-drama films
2021 independent films
2020s crime comedy-drama films
2020s English-language films
2020s mystery comedy-drama films
American crime comedy-drama films
American independent films
American mystery comedy-drama films
2020s American films